Fred Bretonnel (1 January 1905 – 4 September 1928) was a French lightweight boxer and title holder of the Featherweight Championship of France from 24 June to 7 October 1924, when it was taken by Lucien Vinez.
In a career totalling 76 matches, he lost 18, drew 14 and won 42 with 14 knock outs.

He fought in the first French-German match in France after the First World War, on 10 May 1922, defeating Paul Czirson.

Bretonnel's family were also strongly associated with boxing. His brother was a professional boxing trainer and manager, and his father started the first boxing magazine in France.

Bretonnel committed suicide by hanging on 4 September 1928, due to what was referred to as "family troubles". At the time of his death, he was a welterweight.

Notes

External links
 Bretonnel at the Boxing Encyclopedia

1905 births
1928 suicides
Lightweight boxers
French male boxers
Suicides by hanging in France
1928 deaths